Pascal Dominique Gourville (born 12 January 1975) is a retired professional footballer who played as a defender. Born in France, Gourville represented the Mauritania national team internationally.

International career
Gourville was born in France and is of Réunionnais descent. In 2003, he agreed to become a naturalized citizen of Mauritania, following an invitation by fellow Frenchman Noel Tosi, who was then the Mauritania national team and wanted him in the squad. He made his debut for them in a 3–0 2006 FIFA World Cup qualification loss to Zimbabwe on 12 October 2003.

References

External links
 
 
 
 FDB Profile

1975 births
Living people
Footballers from Seine-et-Marne
French footballers
French people of Réunionnais descent
French sportspeople of Mauritanian descent
Grenoble Foot 38 players
FC Gueugnon players
CS Sedan Ardennes players
Le Mans FC players
Valenciennes FC players
Ligue 1 players
Ligue 2 players
Championnat National players
Championnat National 2 players
Championnat National 3 players
Association football defenders
Naturalized citizens of Mauritania
Mauritania international footballers
Mauritanian footballers